Vietnam first competed at the Asian Games in 1954 in Manila, Philippines as State of Vietnam. After the partition of Vietnam, South Vietnam participated from 1958 to 1970. North Vietnam and South Vietnam merged in 1976 and the reunified Vietnam team started competing from 1982 onward. In total, Vietnamese athletes have won 17 gold medals and 180 medals overall at the Asian Games.

Asian Games

Medals by Games

Asian Winter Games

Medals by Games

Asian Para Games

Medals by Games

Asian Beach Games

*Red border color indicates tournament was held on home soil.

Medals by Games

Asian Indoor and Martial Arts Games

*Red border color indicates tournament was held on home soil.

Medals by Games

Asian Youth Games

Medals by Games

Asian Youth Para Games

Medals by Games

References